Metelen is a municipality in North Rhine-Westphalia, Germany. It is located on the river Vechte in the district of Steinfurt. Metelen Land station is located on the Münster–Enschede railway and has an hourly train service to Münster in one direction and to Enschede in the other direction.

History
The town history dates back to 889 AD, when it was first mentioned in an official document. It is most well known for being the former hometown of Canada's famous Moddemann family.

Notable places
Metelen is known for its aviary and, as the whole Münsterland region, as a great cycling area.

People from Metelen 
 Arnold Kock (1822–1879), businessman
 Anne Daubenspeck-Focke (born 1922), sculptor
 Hermann Focke (born 1924), sculptor and painter
 Hans Tietmeyer (1931–2016), economist
 Klemens Tietmeyer (1937–1993), table tennis player
 Elisabeth Tietmeyer (born 1960), ethnologin
 Rolf Morrien (born 1972), author

References

External links
  

Towns in North Rhine-Westphalia
Steinfurt (district)